Josef Nešvera (24 October 1842 in Praskolesy - 12 April 1914 in Olomouc) was a Czech opera composer. Brno Text by the composer. One act. The most successful of Nesvera's five Czech operas. Given in the same year at Olomouc 2 April 1897 (in German) and at Zagreb 5 November 1897 in ..."</ref>

Works, editions and recordings
 Psalm 129, Op.49 published Novello 1889
 Berceuse'' recording Milan Lusk violin solo, with piano. Victor, 1925

References

Czech composers
Czech male composers
1842 births
1914 deaths
People from Beroun District